Justin Robinson (born 17 October 1987) is a British professional basketball player who last played for the London Lions of the British Basketball League (BBL).

Early life
Robinson played for the Brixton TopCats before moving to the United States to attend high school at the Blair Academy. As a junior, he would lead Blair to a Mid-Atlantic Prep League title and was named to the All-MAPL first team.

College career
Robinson played college basketball for the Rider Broncs. During his senior year as team captain he averaged 15.3 points, 3.8 assist, 2.8 rebounds and 1.0 steal a game.

Professional career
In September 2011, Robinson began his professional career with Greek team Maroussi. The next month he left Maroussi and moved to Apollon Limassol of the Cypriot League where he spent the 2011–12 season.

On 6 August 2012, he signed with BC Kyiv of Ukraine. On 26 February 2013, he parted ways with Kyiv. On 3 March 2013, he signed with Uppsala Basket of Sweden for the rest of the season.

During the 2013–14 season he played in Hungary with Falco KC Szombathely and Atomerőmű SE.

On 12 November 2014, he signed with his former team Apollon Limassol of Cyprus. On 25 February 2015, he left Apolon and signed with Kolossos Rodou of the Greek Basket League.

On 17 August 2016, Robinson signed with Slovenian club Union Olimpija. However, only twelve days later, he left the club before appearing in a game for them. On 20 September 2016, he signed with Greek club Doxa Lefkadas. He left Doxa after appearing in 19 games. On 16 March 2017, he signed with the French Pro B club Saint-Quentin for the rest of the season.

On 23 August 2017, Robinson signed with the London Lions of the British Basketball League. In 2019 Robinson won his second BBL MVP award in a row. He averaged 17 points and 5 assists per game during the 2019–20 season. On 13 July 2020 he signed a new 2-year deal with the London Lions.

Career statistics

|-
| style="text-align:left;"| 2017–18
| style="text-align:left;"| London Lions
| 30 || 29 || 29.4 || 48.5 || 45.8 || 83.5 || 3.1 || 5.6 || 1.8 || 0.1 || 17.8 
|-
| style="text-align:left;"| 2018–19
| style="text-align:left;"| London Lions
| 31 || 31 || 32.0 || 41.7 || 36.9 || 86.9 || 3.5 || 4.9 || 1.4 || 0.0 || 19.2 
|-
| style="text-align:left;"| 2019–20
| style="text-align:left;"| London Lions
| 13 || 13 || 32.1 || 42.1 || 33.3 || 87.5 || 3.4 || 4.8 || 1.4 || 0.0 || 16.2
|-

International
Robinson plays for the Great Britain national basketball team, making his debut against Poland in 2009.

References

External links
 Eurobasket.com profile
 RealGM.com profile 
 FIBA.com profile

1987 births
Living people
Apollon Limassol BC players
Basketball players from Greater London
BC Kyiv players
Black British sportsmen
Blair Academy alumni
British expatriate basketball people in the United States
Doxa Lefkadas B.C. players
English expatriate sportspeople in Cyprus
English expatriate sportspeople in Greece
English expatriate sportspeople in the United States
English men's basketball players
Kolossos Rodou B.C. players
London Lions (basketball) players
Maroussi B.C. players
People from Brixton
Point guards
Rider Broncs men's basketball players
Shooting guards
Saint-Quentin Basket-Ball players